Keep Cool Records is an American record label founded by Tunji Balogun, alongside Right Hand Music Group founder Courtney Stewart, A&R Jon Tanners and marketing executive Jared Sherman. The label is a joint venture with RCA Records, a subsidiary of Sony Corporation of America.

History
Tunji Balogun began working with RCA Records as an A&R, where he signed and developed artists Bryson Tiller, GoldLink, Khalid, Wizkid, and H.E.R. He was also involved in the partnership with RCA and Top Dawg Entertainment that signed SZA, bringing Cozz to Dreamville Records, as well as contributing in signing Childish Gambino to RCA. On April 9, 2018, RCA and Keep Cool announced the joint venture record label to sign and develop artists, promoting Tunji Balogun to executive vice president of A&R. Balogun spoke with Billboard about the deal saying: "I’m honored to be able to continue that legacy with the launch of Keep Cool. My passion is discovering and working with artists that are slightly left-of-center, and finding meaningful ways to organically build culture around them. Keep Cool will be a safe-haven for artists and creatives who want to do things differently." The same day, they announced the signing of Normani. In November 2018, they revealed the signings of Lucky Daye and duo VanJess. On February 20, 2019, Keep Cool announced a deal with hip hop duo Freddie Gibbs & Madlib for their second album Bandana. In May 2020, Keep Cool announced the signing of UMI to the label. In February 2021, Keep Cool announced the addition of Louisville-singer Marzz to the roster.

Roster

Current artists

Former artists

Discography

Studio albums

Extended plays

Extended plays

References

American record labels
RCA Records
Contemporary R&B record labels